The following lists events that happened during 1965 in Australia.

Incumbents

 Monarch – Elizabeth II
 Governor-General – Viscount De L'Isle (until 7 May), then Lord Casey
 Prime Minister – Sir Robert Menzies
 Opposition Leader – Arthur Calwell
 Chief Justice – Sir Garfield Barwick

State and Territory Leaders
 Premier of New South Wales – Jack Renshaw (until 13 May), then Robert Askin
 Opposition Leader – Robert Askin (until 13 May), then Jack Renshaw
 Premier of Queensland – Frank Nicklin
 Opposition Leader – Jack Duggan
 Premier of South Australia – Sir Thomas Playford IV (until 10 March), then Frank Walsh
 Opposition Leader – Frank Walsh (until 10 March), then Sir Thomas Playford IV
 Premier of Tasmania – Eric Reece
 Opposition Leader – Angus Bethune
 Premier of Victoria – Henry Bolte
 Opposition Leader – Clive Stoneham
 Premier of Western Australia – David Brand
 Opposition Leader – Albert Hawke

Governors and Administrators
 Governor of New South Wales – Lieutenant General Sir Eric Woodward (until 31 July)
 Governor of Queensland – Colonel Sir Henry Abel Smith
 Governor of South Australia – Lieutenant General Sir Edric Bastyan
 Governor of Tasmania – General Sir Charles Gairdner
 Governor of Victoria – Major General Sir Rohan Delacombe
 Governor of Western Australia – Major General Sir Douglas Kendrew
 Administrator of Nauru –  Reginald Leydin
 Administrator of Norfolk Island – Roger Nott
 Administrator of the Northern Territory – Roger Dean
 Administrator of Papua and New Guinea – Sir Donald Cleland

Events
 actor, dancer and choreographer Sir Robert Helpmann is named Australian of the Year
 the Australian Conservation Foundation is formed
 the Australian Council of National Trusts (ACNT) is formed
 Northern Territory patrol officers forcibly round up the last groups of the Pintubi Aboriginal people still living an independent traditional lifestyle, and resettle them on the Papunya and Yuendumu missions

Events in Australia's history

Jan

7 Australia's first hydrofoil ferry begins service to Manly, in Sydney.

12 Bodies of two 15-year-olds, Christine Sharrock and Marianne Schmidt, found at Wanda Beach, Sydney; case remains unsolved.

16 Passenger and car ferry Empress of Australia begins operating between Sydney and Hobart.

27 Police at Mt Isa given the power to arrest without warrant and ban any person aiding the strike there; Pat Mackie banned.

Feb

11 Mt Isa Mines suspends all operations.

18 Gas (later, oil) struck in Bass Strait from Esso-BHP's Barracouta well.

20 Brand government re-elected in WA.

Duke of Edinburgh visits Australia (to 26th).

22 Royal Australian Mint opened in Canberra by Prince Philip. (Begins producing the first Australian-made decimal coins.)

- Charles Perkins leads a "freedom ride" through NSW in an attempt to end Aboriginal segregation.

Mar

1 Echuca, Vic., gazetted as a city.

6 Labor wins government in SA for the first time in 32 years; Frank Walsh becomes Premier, replacing Sir Thomas Playford, who had been in office for 26 years and four months, a record term in Australia.

10 First drawing of the birthday lottery to determine those eligible for National Service training.

12 Swan Hill, Vic., becomes a city.

17 Legislation introduced outlawing picketing and restricting pamphlets and banners at Mt Isa. (Strikers begin returning to work later in month.)

20 Duke and Duchess of Gloucester visit Australia (to 26 Apr.).

24 Prime Minister Menzies announces a new concept in tertiary education as recommended by the Martin Committee on the Future of Tertiary Education in Australia.

Apr

29 Menzies announces the government's decision to send a combat force to Vietnam following a request from Saigon for more military aid.

May

1 Labor defeated in NSW after 24 years in office; R. W. Askin becomes Premier.

27 First Battalion, Royal Australian Regiment, leaves Sydney in the aircraft-carrier Sydney for active duty in Vietnam.

29 Captain Cook Bridge, Sydney, opened.

Jul

2 Secondary school teachers in Vic. stage a strike, the first teachers' strike in Australia since 1920.

Aug

13 Limited free-trade agreement negotiated between Australia and NZ.

21 Report of the Vernon Committee of Economic Inquiry tabled in federal parliament. (Principal recommendations rejected by government.)

22 Baron Casey succeeds Lord De L'Isle as Governor-General.

Sep

23 Roma Mitchell appointed judge of the Supreme Court of SA-the first woman to become a judge in Australia.

Oct

7 Sir Robert Menzies appointed Lord Warden of the Cinque Ports.

Nov

7 Underground fire at the Bulli colliery, NSW; four miners killed.

16 Economic sanctions imposed on Rhodesia following that country's unilateral declaration of independence.

- Churchill Fellowships awarded for the first time.

Dec

15 Harry Chan becomes the first elected president of the NT Legislative Council.

- First section of the Sydney-Newcastle expressway opened.

Events by month

January

 The Kinks and The Rolling Stones tour Australia
 7 January – The first hydrofoil service begins on Sydney Harbour.
 10 January – Evonne Goolagong wins the NSW junior hard-court title.
 11 January – The bodies of two 15-year-old girls, Christine Sharrock and Marianne Schmidt, are found at Wanda Beach in southern Sydney. Despite the offer of an unprecedented £10,000 reward, the murders are never solved.
 16 January – The vehicular ferry Empress of Australia begins operating between Sydney and Hobart.
 27 January – Queensland Police are given the power to arrest without warrant and ban anyone aiding the striking Mount Isa Mines workers. Union leader Pat Mackie is banned from the site.

February
 Judge Aaron Levine overturns the obscenity conviction of the editors of Oz magazine
 Charles Perkins leads The Freedom Ride, which travels through country NSW, protesting the racial discrimination against Aboriginal people.
 Margaret Court wins the Australian women's tennis singles title for the sixth consecutive year
 18 February – Esso-BHP strikes gas at the Barracouta well in Bass Strait.
 20 February – Freedom Ride participants including Charles Perkins are ejected from the Moree municipal swimming baths after protesting against its policy of not admitting Aborigines.
 22 February – Prince Philip opens the Royal Australian Mint in Canberra.
 Talbot Duckmanton succeeds Sir Charles Moses as chairman of The Australian Broadcasting Commission (ABC)
 The Seekers' single I'll Never Find Another You reaches No. 1 in the UK charts. It becomes the first recording by an Australian act to sell more than 1 million copies and eventually sells more than 1.75 million

March

 1 March – The Amateur Swimming Union of Australia stuns the nation with its decision that Olympic champion and 1964 Australian of the Year Dawn Fraser will be banned from all amateur competition for ten years. The decision follows an inquiry into Fraser's alleged misbehaviour during the 1964 Summer Olympics in Tokyo.
 6 March – The Australian Labor Party wins the South Australian election, taking government for the first time in 32 years. Labor leader Frank Walsh becomes Premier, replacing LCL leader Sir Thomas Playford, Australia's longest-serving premier, who had held office for 26 years, 4 months.
 10 March – The first drawing of the national service conscription lottery.
 17 March – The Queensland government legislates to ban picketing and restricting pamphlets and banners at the Mount Isa mine. The strikers workers return to work later in the month.
 31 March – Merle Thorton and Rosalie Bogner chained their ankles to the front bar of the Regatta Hotel in Brisbane in protest against the Queensland liquor laws that banned women from pubs.
 George Johnston wins the Miles Franklin Award for his novel My Brother Jack

April

 27 April – Police raid Melbourne's Austral Bookshop and seize copies of The Trial of Lady Chatterley, a banned book which recounts of the British obscenity trial of author D. H. Lawrence.
 Prime Minister Robert Menzies announces that an Australian combat force will be sent to South Vietnam in response to a request for military aid from the South Vietnamese government.

May

 1 May – The Australian Labor Party (ALP) is defeated in the NSW state election after 24 years in government and the Liberal Party, led by Robin Askin takes power.
 27 May – The 1st Battalion, Royal Australian Regiment leaves for Vietnam on HMAS Sydney.

June
 The official opening of the Captain Cook Bridge, which spans the Georges River
 TV variety show In Melbourne Tonight celebrates its 2000th performance. Since its premiere in 1957 the show had earned the Nine Network over £AU4 million in advertising revenue and it attracted more viewers per capita than any other television show in the world, with the network rumoured to be paying host Graham Kennedy more than £AU20,000 per year (14 June)
21 June – The Premier of Tasmania, Eric Reece, announces the Gordon Power scheme will "result in some modification to the Lake Pedder National Park", but it was still in development and no further details were revealed.
 30 June – At a speech to the Australian Club in London, PM Sir Robert Menzies declares that Australia is in a state of war in Vietnam.

July
18 to 20 July - Snow is recorded as far north as the Clark Range in Queensland, killing drought-weakened livestock.

August

September

October
30 October – English model Jean Shrimpton wears a controversially short white shift dress to the Victoria Derby at Flemington Racecourse in Melbourne, Australia – a pivotal moment of the introduction of the miniskirt to women's fashion.

November
5 November – The 1st Battalion, Royal Australian Regiment, is deployed in Operation Hump in Vietnam.
13 November – Kevin Arthur Wheatley dies in Vietnam while defending a wounded comrade. He was awarded the Victoria Cross for his gallantry.

December
 25 December - Christmas

Science and technology

 the Siding Springs Observatory opens

Arts and literature

 Clifton Pugh's portrait of R.A. Henderson wins the Archibald Prize for portraiture
 Larry Sitsky's opera The Fall of the House of Usher
 Peter Sculthorpe's Sun Music I
 Joan Sutherland returns to perform in Australia after 14 years overseas
 the Canberra School of Music is established
 Ballet in a Nutshell (later the Sydney Dance Company) and the Australian Dance Theatre form
 The South Australian Theatre Company is formed
 Sydney's Philip St Theatre stages its famous comedy revue A Cup of Tea, a Bex and a Good Lie Down. The production runs for twelve months, and the title passes into common usage.
 The Ambassador (Morris West)
 The Merry-Go-Round in the Sea (Randolph Stow)
 The Slow Natives by Thea Astley is awarded the Miles Franklin Literary Award

Film

 Faces in the Sun wins the AFI Award for Best Film

Television
 Jimmy Hannan wins the Gold Logie Award

Sport
Light Fingers won the Melbourne Cup.

Cricket: Australia lose a five test series away to the West Indies 2–1. The West Indies side includes greats such as Garry Sobers and Rohan Kanhai, while Australia featured opening batsmen Bill Lawry and Bobby Simpson.

Cricinfo series page

Rugby League: 1965 NSWRFL season St. George win the tenth of a record eleven consecutive premierships in the NSWRL, defeating South Sydney 12–8 in the Grand Final. Eastern Suburbs finish in last position, claiming the wooden spoon.

Golf:  The Australian Veteran Golfers Association. (A.V.G.A.) was formed on 7 July 1965 by four businessmen, Messrs. A Hall, W.Foulsham J.Barkel and H.Hattersley.

Births
 25 January – Luke Woolmer, politician
 17 March – Tarnya Smith, politician
 6 April – Tim Nicholls, politician
 18 April – Fiona Simpson, politician
 24 April – Lucinda Cowden, actress
 10 May 
Greg Fasala, swimmer
Paul Langmack, rugby league player and coach
 13 May – John McVeigh, politician
 15 May – Glenn Seton, racing driver
 23 May – Paul Sironen, rugby league player
 31 May – Todd McKenney, entertainer
 2 June – Steve Waugh, Mark Waugh, cricketers
 4 June – Michael Doohan, motorcycle racer
 25 June – Stan Longinidis, heavyweight kickboxer 
 1 July – Simon Youl, tennis player
 7 July – Irina Berezina, Ukrainian-born international chess Master and trainer
 9 July – Steve Minnikin, politician
 12 July – Jennifer Howard, politician
 25 July – Dale Shearer, rugby league footballer
 2 August 
 Andrew Blackman, actor and theatre director
 Joe Hockey, politician
 9 August – Darren Millane, Australian rules football player (d. 1991)
 28 August – Steve Walters, rugby league footballer of the 1980s and 1990s.
 1 September – Craig McLachlan, actor and singer
 19 September – Antonella Gambotto-Burke, author and journalist
 21 September – David Wenham, actor
 26 October – Steve Davies, politician
 29 October – Andrew Ettingshausen, rugby league footballer of the 1980s and 1990s
 1 November – Michael Daley, politician
 5 December – Simon Finn, politician
 7 December – Deborah Bassett, rower
 11 December – Glenn Lazarus, rugby league footballer of the 1980s and 1990s.

Deaths
20 February – Lex Davison, racing driver (born 1923)
2 November – H. V. Evatt, politician and diplomat (born 1894)
15 June – Florence Sulman, author and educationalist (born 1876 in England)

See also
 List of Australian films of the 1960s

References

 
Australia
Years of the 20th century in Australia